Kondoa is a town and administrative ward (called Kondoa Mjini or Kondoa Urban) in the Kondoa District of the Dodoma Region of Tanzania.

Kondoa Town is the district capital of Kondoa District. The local government buildings were mostly built during the German colonization. The town also has a district hospital, three O-Level Secondary schools, one A-Level school for girls, and an agricultural college. There is also a teachers' training college called Bustani (garden in Kiswahili) College. There is a local NMB bank branch.

Geography 

The town has a hot spring that provides drinking water for many inhabitants. There is also a river that runs through the town, though in the dry months there is almost no water above ground. There is a good bridge over the river.

Administrative Units 

The town has two divisions. Kondoa Mjini with 6 wards consisting of 32 villages and neighborhoods, and Kolo with 2 wards consisting of 4 villages and neighborhoods.

Climate 

The climate is semi-arid. The rainy season is from late December to mid March, and Kondoa receives little to no precipitation the rest of the year. The weather is mostly hot.

Demographics 

In 2016 the Tanzania National Bureau of Statistics report there were 64,147 people in the town.

The Warangi is the most populous ethnic group in Kondoa, and their native language is Kirangi. As it was a stop on an ancient caravan road, Kondoa has a sizeable non-Irangi minority. Other tribes include the Wasandewe, Waburunge, Wafyomi, Waalagwa, Wabarbaig, Wamasai, and Wagorowa.

The town is about 70% Muslim and 30% Christian, with aboriginal religions virtually extinct. Relations between religious groups are good.

Transport 

Trunk road T5 from Dodoma to Babati passes through the town.

References 

Kondoa District
Wards of Dodoma Region
Districts of Tanzania